Marie Wimer (February 11, 1876—February 9, 1965) was an American tennis player of the start of the 20th century.

Notably, in 1907, she won the women's doubles at the US Women's National Championship with Carrie Neely.

At the tournament now known as the Cincinnati Masters she:
 reached the singles semifinals in 1903 and the singles quarterfinals in 1904 & 1905
 paired with Myrtle McAteer to win the 1904 doubles title (defeating Winona Closterman and Carrie Neely in the final) and reach the 1903 doubles final (where they fell to Closterman and Neely)

Grand Slam finals

Doubles (1 title, 2 runner-ups)

References 

From Club Court to Center Court by Phillip S. Smith (2008 Edition)

American female tennis players
United States National champions (tennis)
Grand Slam (tennis) champions in women's doubles
1876 births
1965 deaths